The 1988–89 Pittsburgh Panthers men's basketball team represented the University of Pittsburgh in the 1988–89 NCAA Division I men's basketball season. Led by head coach Paul Evans, the Panthers finished with a record of 17–13. They received an at-large bid to the 1989 NCAA Division I men's basketball tournament where, as a #8 seed, they lost in the first round to Ball State.

References

Pittsburgh Panthers men's basketball seasons
Pittsburgh
Pittsburgh
Pittsburgh Pan
Pittsburgh Pan